In the Taking of Flesh is the third studio album from The Burial. Facedown Records released the album on July 9, 2013.

Critical reception

Awarding the album four and a half stars from HM Magazine, David Stagg states, "Having written almost every note on the album, In the Taking of Flesh is somewhat of a masterpiece." Aaron Lambert, giving the album four and a half stars at Jesus Freak Hideout, writes, "no matter what you believe spiritually, In The Taking of Flesh is an absolutely superb metal album that will end up among the best of the year."

Track listing

Personnel
The Burial
 Elisha Mullins - Vocals, Guitars
 Todd Hatfield - Guitars
 Alex Poole - Bass, Lead Guitar (track 9)
 Kaleb Luebchow - Drums

Guest Musicians
 Rich Catalano - Lead Guitars (track 9)
 Matt Nitti - Lead Guitars (track 9)
 James Houseman - Lead Guitars (track 9), orchestration (track 1)
 Jack Daniels - Lead Guitars (track 9)
 Aaron Metz - Lead Guitars (track 9)
 Drew Creal - Lead Guitars (track 9)

Production
 Ian Sheridan - Bass Engineering
 Josh Schroeder - Producer, Engineer, Mixing, Mastering
 Dave Quiggle - Artwork

References

2013 albums
The Burial (metal band) albums
Facedown Records albums